Tabernaemontana cerifera is a species of plant in the family Apocynaceae. It is found in New Caledonia.

References

cerifera
Flora of New Caledonia